Shibli may refer to:

 Abu Bakr Shibli, a 9th and 10th century Sufi mystic
 Ahlam Shibli (born 1970), Palestinian artist
 Shibli Nomani (1857–1914), India Muslim scholar
 Shibli, Iran, a village in East Azerbaijan Province, Iran
 Shibli, Israel, an Arab village on Israel's Mount Tabor in the Lower Galilee, since 1992 a component of the Shibli-Umm al-Ghanam local council
 Shibli Mohammad, a Bangladeshi dancer